St. Paul's Union Church and Cemetery, also known as the Old White Church and Cemetery, is a historic church and cemetery located at Union Township, Schuylkill County, Pennsylvania.  The church was built in 1842, and is a two-story, wood-frame meeting house style building in a vernacular Federal style.  It measures 30 feet, 8 inches, by 40 feet, 4 inches. The church was restored in 1990–1992. The adjacent cemetery includes a number of stone markers in German.

It was added to the National Register of Historic Places in 1995.

References

External links
St. Paul's Union Church Cemetery at Find A Grave

Cemeteries in Pennsylvania
Churches on the National Register of Historic Places in Pennsylvania
Federal architecture in Pennsylvania
German-American culture in Pennsylvania
Churches completed in 1842
19th-century churches in the United States
Churches in Schuylkill County, Pennsylvania
National Register of Historic Places in Schuylkill County, Pennsylvania